Joazi Oliveira da Silva (born 28 October 1996) is a Brazilian footballer who plays for Uberlândia as a right back.

Club career
Born in Recife, Joazi joined the youth academy of Náutico in 2011. In January 2015, he was promoted to the senior team at the age of 17, becoming the youngest member of the squad. However, he spent the season on loan, first at Porto in Campeonato Pernambucano and then with the under-20 team of Palmeiras.

On 20 April 2016, Joazi scored his first goal for Náutico in a 3–1 defeat against Santa Cruz in Campeonato Pernambucano. He played regularly during the season and his contract was extended until 2018 on 5 October.

Joazi broke the medial collateral ligament of his right knee on 15 February 2017, during a Copa do Brasil match against Guarani de Juazeiro. Subsequently, he was ruled out of play for three months. After playing irregularly during the season during which his club was relegated, he was loaned out to Boa Esporte on 20 November.

On 3 January 2019, Joazi signed with CSA for the upcoming season.

Career statistics

References

1996 births
Living people
Association football defenders
Brazilian footballers
Campeonato Brasileiro Série B players
Campeonato Brasileiro Série D players
Clube Náutico Capibaribe players
Clube Atlético do Porto players
Boa Esporte Clube players
Centro Sportivo Alagoano players
América Futebol Clube (RN) players
Uberlândia Esporte Clube players
Sportspeople from Recife